KMSP-TV (channel 9) is a television station licensed to Minneapolis, Minnesota, United States, serving as the Fox network outlet for the Twin Cities area. It is owned and operated by the network's Fox Television Stations division alongside MyNetworkTV station WFTC (channel 9.2). Both stations share studios on Viking Drive in Eden Prairie; while KMSP-TV's transmitter is located in Shoreview, Minnesota.

KMSP-TV also serves the Mankato market (via K35KI-D in nearby St. James through the local municipal-operated Cooperative TV (CTV) network of translators), even though that area already has a Fox affiliate of its own. KMSP is also carried on the main channel of KFTC (channel 26), a satellite station of WFTC licensed to Bemidji which serves the northernmost reaches of the Minneapolis–St. Paul television market.

KMSP-TV is also carried in Canada on Shaw Cable's Thunder Bay, Ontario system, on Tbaytel, and on Bell MTS Fibe TV in the province of Manitoba. Since October 2022, the station is also carried on Westman Communications, replacing Rochester, New York's WUHF.

History

The Family Broadcasting Corporation in Minneapolis, owner of radio station KEYD (1440 AM, now KYCR), filed an application with the FCC for a construction permit for a new commercial television station to be operated on Channel 9 on November 24, 1953. WLOL and WDGY (now KTLK) also expressed interest, but withdrew their applications in 1954, assuring that the new station would go to KEYD and its owner, Family Broadcasting. KEYD-TV began broadcasting on January 9, 1955, and was affiliated with the DuMont Television Network. During this time, Harry Reasoner, a graduate of Minneapolis West High School and the University of Minnesota, was hired as the station's first news anchor and news director. However, DuMont shut down in late 1956, leaving the station as an independent outlet; on June 3, 1956, the KEYD stations were sold to United Television, whose principals at the time included several stockholders of Pittsburgh station WENS, for $1.5 million. The new owners immediately sold off KEYD radio, refocused KEYD-TV's programming on films and sports, and shut down the news department; Reasoner was hired by CBS News a few months later. Reasoner became a host for CBS's 60 Minutes when it launched in 1968.

Channel 9 changed its call letters to KMGM-TV on May 23, 1956. At the time, the station was in negotiations with Metro-Goldwyn-Mayer to acquire the Twin Cities television rights to the company's films, along with selling a 25 percent stake in KMGM-TV to the studio. Negotiations broke down later that month over the cost of the films; additionally, Loew's, MGM's parent company at the time, filed a petition with the FCC against the call sign change, claiming that the use of KMGM was unauthorized and a violation of MGM's trademark. The FCC ruled against Loew's that October, saying that its call sign assignment policies were limited to preventing confusion between stations in a given area. The agreements to lease MGM's pre-1949 films and sell 25 percent of the station to Loew's were both completed that November; KMGM was the third station, after future sister station KTTV in Los Angeles and KTVR in Denver, to enter into such an arrangement.

National Telefilm Associates, which later purchased WNTA-TV in the New York City area, purchased the 75 percent of United Television not owned by MGM for $650,000 in November 1957, joining it to the NTA Film Network until it ended in 1961. After taking control, NTA expanded KMGM-TV's hours of operation as part of an overhaul of channel 9's schedule that also included the addition of newscasts. A few months later, on February 10, 1958, NTA bought MGM's stake for $130,000 and announced that it would change channel 9's calls to KMSP-TV; the call sign change took effect that March over the objections of KSTP-TV (channel 5). National Theatres, a theater chain whose broadcast holdings already included WDAF AM-TV in Kansas City, began the process of acquiring NTA in November 1958; in April 1959, it purchased 88 percent of the company. 20th Century-Fox, the former parent company of National Theatres, bought KMSP-TV for $4.1 million on November 9, 1959, retaining the United Television corporate name. The KMSP call letters were featured on prop television cameras in the May 29, 1963, episode of the CBS sitcom The Many Loves of Dobie Gillis, produced by 20th Century Fox Television; the show was loosely set in the Twin Cities area. The episode was titled "The Call of the, Like, Wild".

During its early years until 1972, the station's studios and offices were located in a lower level of the Foshay Tower in downtown Minneapolis; the transmitter was located on top of the tower, the tallest structure in the area until 1971, along with WCCO-TV (channel 4) and WTCN-TV (channel 11, now KARE).

As an ABC affiliate
KMSP-TV took over the ABC affiliation from WTCN-TV on April 16, 1961. Throughout its years with ABC, KMSP was notorious for having a sub-standard news department with large staff turnover. Ratings were dismal with KMSP obtaining only one-third of the viewing audience of each of their two competitors, CBS affiliate WCCO-TV and NBC affiliate KSTP-TV. The station's transmitter was moved in 1971 to a new tower constructed by KMSP in Shoreview, while the studios and offices relocated in 1972 to Edina on York Avenue South, across from Southdale Shopping Center.

In the late 1970s, ABC steadily rose to first place in the network ratings. Accordingly, the network sought to upgrade its slate of affiliates, which were made up of some stations that either had poor signals or poorly performing local programming. In December 1977, ABC warned KMSP that it would yank its affiliation unless improvements were made and fast. In early 1978, to cash in on ABC's improved ratings, KMSP re-branded itself "ABC9" (approximately 20 years before the use of a network's name in a station's on-air branding became commonplace among U.S. affiliates), and retooled its newscast. Despite the changes, KMSP's news department remained a distant third behind WCCO-TV and KSTP-TV.

Becoming an independent once again

On August 29, 1978, ABC announced that KSTP-TV would become the network's new Twin Cities affiliate the following spring. The signing of channel 5 made nationwide news, as it had been an NBC affiliate for three decades. KSTP-TV looked forward to affiliating with the top network, as third-place NBC had been in a long ratings slump. In retaliation for losing ABC, KMSP-TV immediately removed all ABC branding and regularly preempted network programming. Channel 9 then attempted to affiliate with NBC, thinking The Tonight Show would be a good lead-out from their 10 p.m. newscast, despite low prime time ratings. However, NBC, miffed at losing one of its strongest affiliates, and not wanting to pick up ABC's rejects, turned down KMSP's offer almost immediately and signed an affiliation agreement with independent station WTCN-TV. As a result of being rejected by both ABC and NBC, KMSP-TV prepared to become an independent station. Although it now faced a lack of weekend and weekday national sports coverage and having to buy seven to eight additional hours of programming per day, it also would not have to invest nearly as much into its news department and could invest its affiliate dues into syndicated film rights and local sports instead. Most of the on-air and off-air staffers resigned, not wanting to work for a down-scaled independent operation.

The affiliation switch occurred on March 5, 1979, and KMSP debuted its new independent schedule featuring cartoons, syndicated shows and even the locally based American Wrestling Association, with much of the station's programming having been acquired from WTCN-TV. To emphasize that the station's programming decisions would be influenced by viewers instead of a network, KMSP rebranded itself as "Receptive Channel 9", and an antenna was shown atop the station's logo in station identifications. The station became quite aggressive in acquiring programming, obtaining broadcast rights to several state high school sports championships from the MSHSL, the NHL's Minnesota North Stars and the Minnesota Twins baseball team.

As it turned out, KMSP's transition into an independent station turned out to be a blessing in disguise. It was far more successful than the station ever had been as an ABC affiliate. It became a regional superstation, available on nearly every cable system in Minnesota as well as large portions of North Dakota, South Dakota, Iowa and Wisconsin. Over time, it became one of the most successful and profitable independent stations in the country.

KMSP went through another ownership change on June 9, 1981, when 20th Century-Fox spun off United Television as an independent company owned by Fox shareholders; the transaction was approved alongside the $700 million sale of 20th Century-Fox to Marvin Davis. Chris-Craft Industries, which in 1977 had acquired an interest in 20th Century-Fox that by 1981 comprised 22 percent of Fox's stock, received a 19 percent stake in United Television; later in June, it filed with the FCC for control of United, as it now owned 32 percent of its stock. Two years later, Chris-Craft, though its BHC subsidiary, increased its stake in United Television to 50.1 percent and gained majority control of the company.

First Fox affiliation, then back to independent
KMSP-TV remained an independent station through 1986 when it became one of the original charter affiliates of the newly launched Fox network on October 9. This suited channel 9, as it wanted the prestige of being a network affiliate without being tied down to a network-dominated program schedule; at the time, Fox only programmed a nightly talk show and, starting in 1987, two nights of prime time programming; the network would start its full-week programming schedule in 1993. For its first few years with Fox, the station served as the de facto Fox affiliate for nearly all of Minnesota and South Dakota.

However, the station did not remain a Fox affiliate for long. By 1988, KMSP was one of several Fox affiliates nationwide that were disappointed with the network's weak programming offerings, particularly on Saturday nights, which were bogging down KMSP's otherwise successful independent lineup. That January, channel 9 dropped Fox's Saturday night lineup; the move did not sit well with Fox, and in July 1988 the network announced that it would not renew its affiliations with KMSP and Chris-Craft sister station KPTV in Portland, Oregon. Fox then signed an agreement with KITN (channel 29, now WFTC) to become its new Twin Cities affiliate, and KMSP reverted to being an independent station full-time. In 1992, the station relocated to its current studio facilities on Viking Drive in Eden Prairie. Along with the other United Television stations, KMSP carried programming from the Prime Time Entertainment Network from 1993 to 1995.

As a UPN affiliate
By the early 1990s, Fox had exploded in popularity; it had begun carrying strong shows that were starting to rival the program offerings of the "Big Three" networks and had just picked up the broadcast rights to the NFL's National Football Conference. In response to this, in October 1993, Chris-Craft/United Television partnered with Paramount Pictures (which was acquired by Viacom in 1994) to form the United Paramount Network (UPN) and both companies made independent stations that both companies respectively owned in several large and mid-sized U.S. cities charter stations of the new network.

UPN launched on January 16, 1995, (with the two-hour premiere of Star Trek: Voyager), with channel 9 becoming a UPN owned-and-operated station due to Chris-Craft/United's ownership stake in the network (later part-ownership in 1996 when Viacom bought a 50% stake of the network)—making it the second network-owned station in the Twin Cities (alongside CBS-owned WCCO-TV). Over time, KMSP became one of UPN's most successful affiliates in terms of viewership. In addition to UPN's prime-time schedule and the network's daytime children's blocks (such as UPN Kids from 1995 to 1999, and Disney's One Too from 1999 to 2003), the station was still enjoying success with local sports programming featuring the Minnesota Twins, as well as the MSHSL championships. KMSP was stripped of its status as a UPN owned-and-operated station in 2000 after Viacom exercised a contractual clause to buy out Chris-Craft's stake in the network, although the station remained with UPN as an affiliate for another two years. Around this time, Viacom bought CBS (and in turn, WCCO).

Return to Fox as an owned-and-operated station
News Corporation, through its Fox Television Stations subsidiary, agreed to purchase Chris-Craft Industries and its stations, including KMSP-TV, for $5.35 billion in August 2000 (this brought KMSP, along with San Antonio's KMOL-TV and Salt Lake City's KTVX, back under common ownership with 20th Century Fox); the deal followed a bidding war with Viacom. The sale was completed on July 31, 2001. While Fox pledged to retain the Chris-Craft stations' UPN affiliations through at least the 2000–01 season, and Chris-Craft agreed to an 18-month renewal for its UPN affiliates in January 2001, an affiliation swap was expected once KMSP's affiliation agreement with UPN ran out in 2002, given Fox's presumed preference to have its programming on a station that it already owned. Additionally, KMSP's signal was much stronger than that of WFTC; it was a VHF station that had been on the air much longer than UHF outlet WFTC. Most importantly, Fox had been aggressively expanding local news programming on its stations, and KMSP had an established and competitive news department whereas WFTC's news department did not begin operations until April 2001. The move was made easier when, in July 2001, Fox agreed to trade KTVX and KMOL (now WOAI-TV) to Clear Channel Communications in exchange for WFTC, a transaction completed that October.

The affiliation switch, officially announced in May 2002, occurred on September 8, 2002 (accompanied by a "Make the Switch" ad campaign that was seen on both stations), as Fox programming returned to KMSP-TV after a 14-year absence, while WFTC took the UPN affiliation; KMSP was the only former Chris-Craft station that was acquired and kept by Fox that did not retain its UPN affiliation. The station began carrying Fox's entire programming schedule at that time, including the Fox Box children's block (which later returned to WFTC as 4KidsTV, until the block was discontinued by Fox in December 2008 due to a dispute with 4Kids Entertainment). The affiliation swap coincided with the start of the 2002 NFL season; KMSP effectively became the "home" station for the NFL's Minnesota Vikings as a result of Fox holding the broadcast rights to the National Football Conference (from 1994 to 2001, most Vikings games were aired on WFTC). Finally, in 2014, with the launch of Xploration Station which replaced Weekend Marketplace which WFTC carried, KMSP-TV began clearing the entire Fox network schedule for good.

Since Fox has affiliates in most media markets and the Federal Communications Commission's syndication exclusivity regulations normally require cable systems to only carry a given network's local affiliate, and Fox prefers only an area's affiliate be carried as opposed to a distant station for rating tabulation purposes, KMSP was eventually removed from most cable providers outside the Twin Cities. By this time, these areas had enough stations to provide local Fox affiliates. KMSP thus effectively lost the "regional superstation" status it had held for almost a quarter-century, dating back to when it was an independent station. Due to the advent of digital television, many stations in smaller markets previously served by KMSP began operating UPN-affiliated digital subchannels towards the end of the network's run to replace that network's programming in those markets, which in turn became MyNetworkTV or CW affiliates.

On December 14, 2017, The Walt Disney Company, owner of KSTP-TV's affiliated network ABC, announced its intent to buy KMSP-TV's parent company, 21st Century Fox, for $66.1 billion; the sale, which closed on March 20, 2019, excluded KMSP-TV and sister station WFTC as well as the Fox network, the MyNetworkTV programming service, Fox News, Fox Sports 1, the Big Ten Network and the Fox Television Stations unit, which were all transferred to the newly formed Fox Corporation. Fox Sports North would be divested in a separate deal to Diamond Sports Group, made up of a joint venture of WUCW owner Sinclair Broadcast Group and Entertainment Studios.

News operation
KMSP presently broadcasts  hours of locally produced newscasts each week (with 10 hours each weekday, four hours on Saturdays, and  hours on Sundays); in regards to the number of hours devoted to news programming, it is the highest newscast output among Minneapolis' broadcast television stations.

The station's first news director and news anchor was Harry Reasoner when KMSP signed on (as KEYD-TV) in 1955. Despite the station's focus on live coverage of news and sports, as well as awards from the University of Minnesota Journalism School and the Northwest Radio–TV News Association, KEYD's newscasts were generally in fourth place in the ratings. After channel 9's ownership changed in 1956, the news operation was closed down. News programming returned to the station after NTA bought KMGM-TV in 1957.

The station, which had long been a distant third to WCCO-TV and KSTP-TV in the Twin Cities news ratings, began an aggressive campaign in 1973 to gain ground against its competition. After a nationwide search, management hired Ben Boyett and Phil Bremen to anchor a newscast with a new set and format, known as newsnine. The new format did not really draw many new viewers, and the station's low news budget, ill-conceived promotion, and frequent technical glitches, along with its network's news division's overall struggles and wire service before Roone Arledge took control, didn't help matters. One botched campaign for a news series on venereal disease, in the spring of 1974, resulted in lawsuits from two young women that claimed that their likenesses were used in promos without their permission, thus damaging their reputations. By the fall of 1975, Boyett and Bremen would be gone, replaced by respected veteran newsman Don Harrison and the station's first female anchor, Cathie Mann. These changes did little to take channel 9 out of third place, and despite ABC becoming the #1 network by 1977 and Arledge's moves to increase ABC News's prestige, KMSP's newscasts still struggled.

After KMSP lost the ABC affiliation in 1979, the station's news operation reduced to a more scaled-down 9 p.m. or post-sports-only newscast which was more manageable for KMSP to maintain at the time. It was paired with the syndicated Independent Network News in the early-to-mid 1980s. The newscast's budget and ratings would increase by the end of that decade, with re-expansions of the news department into the morning and early evenings occurring in the mid 90s.

By the end of the decade, Minnesota 9 News was competitive with the other stations in the market, especially with its all-local morning newscast doing well against the network morning shows. This was despite KMSP being hamstrung by its UPN affiliation, which had seen several affiliates of the network cut or close their news departments through its decade of existence, due to the network's overall and prime time ratings failing to meet expectations. Outside of UPN's Star Trek series, the rest of the network's programming schedule struggled outside of cities, a particular issue that affected KMSP as a statewide superstation with a wide rural footprint. This played into the station's decision to eschew their owner-mandated "UPN 9" branding for the more neutral statewide branding of "Minnesota 9" (later, 9 News) to promote their news department.

When KMSP rejoined Fox in 2002, the station's prime time newscast, now with the stronger aid of Fox's prime time lineup and sports coverage, frequently outrated the newscasts on KSTP-TV. Following Fox's acquisition of WFTC in 2001, that station's existing news operation was moved into an auxiliary studio of KMSP as part of a slow merger (including limited story-sharing); after Fox canceled channel 29's newscast in 2006, some of WFTC's staff moved in full to KMSP.

On May 11, 2009, KMSP became the second station in the Twin Cities (behind KARE-TV) to broadcast local newscasts in high-definition.

Controversy
On June 16, 2006, during one of the station's newscasts, KMSP broadcast a "video news release" about convertibles produced by General Motors without required attribution that it was distributed by the auto giant. The narrator, MediaLink publicist Andrew Schmertz, was introduced as reporter André Schmertz. On March 24, 2011, the FCC levied a $4,000 fine against KMSP for airing the video news release without disclosing the corporate source of the segment to its viewers, following complaints filed by the Free Press and the Center for Media and Democracy in 2006 and 2007.

On-air staff

Notable current on-air staff
 Randy Meier anchor
 Dawn Mitchell anchor/reporter

Notable former on-air staff
 Heidi Collins — news anchor (2010–2013); previously with CNN
 Rod Grams — news anchor (1982–1991); later U.S. Senator (deceased)
 Don Harrison — news anchor (1975–1979); later with Headline News (deceased)
 Jack Horner — sports anchor (1950s) (deceased)
 Bob Kurtz — sports anchor, Minnesota Twins play-by-play announcer (1979–1986), later with KSTP-AM, Minnesota Wild
 George Noory — news director (late 1970s); later host of Coast To Coast AM
 Hank Plante — news reporter (1979–1980); recipient of five Emmy Awards and a George Foster Peabody Award; later with KPIX-TV/San Francisco
 Ahmad Rashad — sports anchor (1978); previously a player with the Minnesota Vikings and later host of NBA TV's NBA Inside Stuff
 Harry Reasoner — KMSP's first news director/anchor (1950s); later with CBS News and ABC News (deceased)
 Robyne Robinson — news anchor (1990–2010)

Technical information

Subchannels
The digital signal of KMSP-TV contains six subchannels, while WFTC's signal contains four. Through the use of virtual channels, WFTC's subchannels are associated with channel 9.

In November 2009, KMSP began broadcasting a standard definition simulcast of WFTC on its second subchannel (virtual channel 29.2), with WFTC's adding a standard definition simulcast of KMSP on its second subchannel (virtual channel 9.2) in turn. This ensures the reception of both stations, even in cases where the digital channels that KMSP and WFTC operate are not actually receivable.

On June 19, 2014, KMSP-TV announced plans that, effective June 24, 2014, they would broadcast their 9.1 virtual channel via RF channel 29 (with RF channel 9 mapping to PSIP 9.9) to take advantage of its broader coverage area and allow viewers with UHF-only antennas to receive the station in high definition. The Minneapolis–St. Paul market is unique in that all three television duopolies in the market, which besides KMSP/WFTC, include Twin Cities PBS stations KTCA/KTCI and Hubbard Broadcasting's KSTP and KSTC, have merged their various signals onto the same VHF PSIP channel slots for easier viewer reference (with all but KMSP-TV transmitting on UHF). KMSP and WFTC unified all of their over-the-air channels as virtual subchannels of KMSP. As a result, the PSIPs of WFTC changed to channel 9.

Analog-to-digital conversion
KMSP-TV originally broadcast its digital signal on UHF channel 26, which was remapped as virtual channel 9 on digital television receivers through the use of PSIP. The station shut down its analog signal, over VHF channel 9, on June 12, 2009, the official date in which full-power television stations in the United States transitioned from analog to digital broadcasts under federal mandate. The station's digital signal relocated from its pre-transition UHF channel 26 to VHF channel 9 for post-transition operations.

Broadcasting facilities
The KMSP TV Tower is located in Shoreview, Minnesota. Several FM stations are also on the tower: KQRS-FM ("92 KQRS"), KXXR ("93X"), KTCZ ("Cities 97.1"), KTIS-FM, KSJN, KFXN-FM ("The Fan"), KDWB, KEEY ("K102"), KMNB ("102.9 The Wolf"), and KZJK ("104.1 Jack FM").

Translators
In addition to the main transmitter in Shoreview and full-power KFTC-DT1 in Bemidji, KMSP's signal is relayed to outlying parts of Minnesota through a network of translators.

The following translators rebroadcast WFTC:
 Alexandria: K30AF-D
 Frost: K29IF-D
 Jackson: K34NU-D
 Olivia: K34OZ-D
 Redwood Falls: K19CV-D
 St. James: K23MF-D
 Walker: K21HX-D
 Willmar: K30FZ-D

The following translators rebroadcast KMSP-TV:
 Alexandria: K32EB-D
 Frost: K19LJ-D
 Jackson: K31NT-D
 St. James: K16CG-D
 Walker: K21HX-D
 Willmar: K36OL-D

The following translators rebroadcast KFTC:
 Brainerd: K20NH-D
 Red Lake: K34NP-D

References
 National Television Academy Upper Midwest Chapter list of Upper Midwest Emmy Awards
 Your Newsnine Station: The saga of KMSP-TV Minneapolis – St. Paul in the 1970s
 Minnesota TV Translators and Satellite Channels – Northpine.com
 Center for Media and Democracy
 FCC Listing of All Low Power, Full Power, and Translators, both Analog and Digital.
 Historical reference to KEYD-TV and AM, Pavek Museum of Broadcasting.
 Historical reference to 1954 applications for TV channel 9 by WDGY Radio and WLOL Radio, Box Office Magazine, April 24, 1954, page 71

External links
 
 Historical KMSP footage at tcmedianow.com
 RabbitEars.info website – KMSP
 Photo of Harry Reasoner in 1955 with KEYD from the Minnesota Historical Society
 KEYD studio photo, Slim Jim's Country Western Show

Television stations in Minneapolis–Saint Paul
Fox Television Stations
Fox network affiliates
Buzzr affiliates
TheGrio affiliates
Story Television affiliates
Television channels and stations established in 1955
National Hockey League over-the-air television broadcasters
1955 establishments in Minnesota